Loxostege aemulalis is a moth in the family Crambidae. It was described by Paul Dognin in 1905. It is found in Bolivia.

The wingspan is about 23 mm. The forewings are uniform smoky fuscous. The hindwings are ochreous orange with a smoky-fuscous border on the costa and outer margin. Adults have been recorded on wing in June.

References

Pyraustinae
Moths described in 1905